Oak Kyar Myet Pauk is a 2016 Burmese drama film, directed by  Nyunt Myanmar Nyi Nyi Aung starring Nay Toe, Htun Htun, Nay Min, Soe Myat Thuzar and Thet Mon Myint. The film, produced by Shwe Sin Oo Film Production premiered in Myanmar on May 6, 2016.

Cast
Nay Toe as Shwe Oak
Htun Htun as Phoe Tha Kyar
Nay Min as Myet Yaing
Thet Mon Myint as Pauk Pauk
Soe Myat Thuzar as Ma Ma Gyi
Zin Wine as U Sein Oak
Sandi Myint Lwin as Young Ma Ma Gyi

Awards

References

2016 films
2010s Burmese-language films
Films shot in Myanmar
2016 drama films
Burmese drama films